Garra imberbis is a species of ray-finned fish in the genus Garra, endemic to Myanmar.

References 

Garra
Fish described in 1890